Ryuichi Obata (born 9 February 1955) is a Japanese equestrian. He competed at the 1976 Summer Olympics, the 1984 Summer Olympics and the 2004 Summer Olympics.

References

1955 births
Living people
Japanese male equestrians
Olympic equestrians of Japan
Equestrians at the 1976 Summer Olympics
Equestrians at the 1984 Summer Olympics
Equestrians at the 2004 Summer Olympics
Place of birth missing (living people)